The John Reading Farmstead is a historic house located at 76 River Road by the South Branch Raritan River in Raritan Township, near Flemington in Hunterdon County, New Jersey. It was built in 1760 for John Reading, former governor of the Province of New Jersey, 1757–1758. The house was added to the National Register of Historic Places on November 21, 1978, for its significance in agriculture, architecture, politics, and exploration/settlement.

History
From 1712 to 1715, John Reading, a surveyor at the time, bought  of land along the South Branch of the Raritan River. After he retired from government, he built this house in 1760, based on the Trenton mansion used by governor Lewis Morris (1671–1746).

Description
The house is built of brick in Georgian style and features Flemish bond brickwork. The west wall has the date, 1760, in glazed header bricks. The property includes a shed and two attached barns to the south. The  property overlooks the South Branch of the Raritan River.

Gallery

See also 
 List of the oldest buildings in New Jersey

References

External links
 
 
 

Raritan Township, New Jersey
National Register of Historic Places in Hunterdon County, New Jersey
Houses on the National Register of Historic Places in New Jersey
New Jersey Register of Historic Places
Pre-statehood history of New Jersey
Houses in Hunterdon County, New Jersey
Georgian architecture in New Jersey
Houses completed in 1760
Brick buildings and structures